The Asia Cross Country Rally (also known as AXCR), is an FIA certified event, in compliance with the Standard Regulations for Cross Country Rallies and the present Supplementary Regulations. This cross-country rally, which began in 1996 and is now (2008) in its 13th year. When the AXCR first started, premium event like the Paris-Dakar Rally was already well known. However, the Paris-Dakar Rally is a long way away, and much too expensive for Asian competitors to consider unless they had factory backing.

This annual rally is organised by R1 Asia, a group of companies formerly known as ORTEV International.

The Asia Cross Country Rally route is designed to cover many types of terrain like jungles, swamps river-crossings and also desert… and over the past years, has included almost every kind of challenge that nature has to offer in these parts of the world.

Designed as a test of driving and navigation skill, endurance and teamwork, as well as the preparation, durability and toughness of the 4 wheel drive vehicles, the Asia Cross Country Rally has gained a loyal following among 4 wheel enthusiasts throughout many parts of Asia.

Each year, the Asia Cross Country Rally provides participants with a variety of terrain challenges spread over 6 to 9 days and covering from 2,000 km to 4,200 km over as many places as possible. In addition to this, it also provides the opportunity for the young people to meet and make friends with others from different countries in the region.

History

2008 results 

* Did Not Finish

References

External links 
 Official Asia Cross Country Rally Website
 AXCR Photo Gallery
 FIA Website
 R1 Asia (Organiser)

Rally raid races
Asian international sports competitions